Mech-Mind Robotics (short for Mech-Mind Robotics Technologies Ltd.), simply as Mech-Mind, is an AI+3D robotics company founded by Tianlan Shao in 2016. The company focuses on industrial 3D cameras and software suites for robotic applications. Its main products include Mech-Eye series, Mech-Vision, Mech-DLK, and Mech-Viz, which can be used in the logistics, automotive, home appliance, and steel industries.

Mech-Mind's products are designed to manage industrial automation applications, including machine tending, bin picking, depalletizing, assembly and more. After its inception, it was funded by Sequoia, IDG Capital, and Intel Capital. In June 2021, the company was included in a Frost & Sullivan analysis on advanced manufacturing.

History
Established in 2016, Mech-Mind made its first public debut at the 2017 Hannover Messe. In 2019, it was backed by Intel Capital.

The company completed a Series C round of financing in 2021, with investors including IDG Capital, among others.

By the end of April 2022, Mech-Mind had established operations in Germany, Japan, and the United States.

References

Industrial robotics companies
Technology companies established in 2016
Manufacturing companies established in 2016